Rejang dance is a sacred Balinese dance, a sacrificial dance in which the girls offer themselves to the gods. It is usually held at the Hindu temple's of Klungkung Regency and Karangasem Regency in Bali, Indonesia. “Rejang” means “offering”, a dance to greet the gods that come down to the Earth. This dance is part of the sacred offering ceremonies, which all happen around about the same time on Bali's ceremonial calendar.

The main occasion is arranged as a three-day ceremony at the village hall of Bale Agung. The dancers required no prior training, in a believe that the spirit of ngayah would guide them to perform the dance movements harmoniously. Girls as young as two or three can be included in the procession. The dance is also known as ngeremas, Simi or sutri.

See also

Pendet
Joged
Janger
Balinese dance

References

Dances of Bali
Sacred dance